The 1979 Scheldeprijs was the 66th edition of the Scheldeprijs cycle race and was held on 31 July 1979. The race was won by Daniel Willems.

General classification

References

1979
1979 in road cycling
1979 in Belgian sport
July 1979 sports events in Europe